Koller or Köller is a Germanic surname. Notable people with the surname include:

 Alexander von Koller (1813-1890), Austro-Hungarian military officer
 Alexandru Koller (born 1953), Romanian football player
 Alice Koller (1925-2020), American writer and academic
 Ákos Koller (born 1974), Romanian-born Hungarian football player
 Arnold Koller (born 1933), Swiss politician
 Ben Koller (born 1980), drummer of the American band Converge
 Broncia Koller-Pinell (1863-1934), American painter
 Cárlos Koller (born 1890-?), Chilean cyclist
 Celine Koller (born 1996), Swiss curler
 Dagmar Koller (born 1939), Austrian actress and singer
 Daphne Koller (born 1968), American computer scientist
 David Koller (born 1960), Czech singer 
 Edmund Koller (1930-1998), West German bobsledder 
 Franz Koller (born 1947), Austrian farmer and politician 
 Fred Koller (born 1950), American singer-songwriter 
 George Koller (born 1958), Canadian bassist 
 Hans Koller (1921–2003), Austrian jazz musician and painter
 Hans Koller (born 1970), German-born UK-based jazz pianist
 Jackie French Koller (born 1948), American author
 James Koller (1936-2014), American poet
 Jan Koller (1901-?), Czech sports shooter
 Jan Koller (born 1973), Czech football player
 Jenny Thomann-Koller (1866-1949), Swiss gynecologist and pediatrician
 Johann Koller (born 1921), Austrian field hockey player
 Karl Koller (ophthalmologist) (1857–1944), Austrian ophthalmologist
 Karl Koller (general) (1898–1951), German Luftwaffe general
 Karl Koller (1929-2009), Austrian footballer
 Károly Koller (1838-1889), Austro-Hungarian photographer and painter
 Krisztián Koller (born 1983), Hungarian footballer
 Lou and Pete Koller, members of the American band Sick of It All
 Lorenz Koller (born 1994), Austrian luger
 Marcel Koller (born 1960), Swiss football player
 Marco Köller (born 1969), German footballer
 Marian Wolfgang Koller (1792-1866), Austrian scientist and educator
 Nicole Koller (born 1997), Swiss racing cyclist
 Noemie Benczer Koller (born 1933), American nuclear physicist
 Patrick Koller (born 1983), Austrian freestyle skier
 Peo Charles Koller (1904–1979) Hungarian-born cytologist and cytogeneticist
 Rudolf Koller (1828–1905), Swiss painter
 Uwe Köller (born 1964), German trumpeter
 Veronika Koller (born 1973), Austrian-British linguist
 Xavier Koller (born 1944), Oscar-winning filmmaker

See also
 Kohler (disambiguation)
 Köhler
 Koehler

Occupational surnames
German-language surnames